Mauro Adrián Ortíz Gómez (born August 7, 1972) is a Mexican football manager and former player.

References

External links

1972 births
Living people
Mexican footballers
Association football midfielders
C.F. Oaxtepec footballers
Deportivo Toluca F.C. players
Liga MX players
Mexican football managers
Footballers from Guadalajara, Jalisco